The Agincourt Carol (sometimes known as the Agincourt Song, the Agincourt Hymn, or by its chorus and central words, Deo gratias Anglia) is an English folk song written some time in the early 15th century. It recounts the 1415 Battle of Agincourt, in which the English army led by Henry V of England defeated that of the French Charles VI in what is now the Pas-de-Calais region of France. 

The carol is one of thirteen on the Trinity Carol Roll, probably originating in East Anglia, that has been held in the Wren Library of Trinity College, Cambridge, since the 19th century. The other primary source for the carol is the contemporaneous Selden Carol Book held by the Bodleian Library in Oxford.

The carol is featured in Laurence Olivier's 1944 film Henry V. The composer Ernest Farrar created his 1918 Heroic Elegy: For Soldiers on the basis of the Agincourt Carol.

Lyrics 
Deo gratias Anglia redde pro victoria!
[Give thanks, England, to God for victory!]

Chorus
Deo gratias!
Deo gratias Anglia redde pro victoria!

Chorus

Chorus

Chorus

Chorus

The pattern of a strophe (verse) sung in English followed by a burden (chorus) in Latin followed a structure typical of the religious carols of the period.

The Agincourt Carol was recorded by The Young Tradition on Galleries, (with both the Early Music Consort and Dave Swarbrick contributing), and by the Silly Sisters (band) (Maddy Prior and June Tabor) on their second album No More to the Dance.

References

External links 
 Agincourt carol sheet music
 IMSLP
 Medieval primary sources
 YouTube Interpretation by The Young Tradition (Peter Bellamy. Royston Wood, Heather Wood), with David Munrow on shawm, Roddy and Adam Skeaping on viols, and Christopher Hogwood on percussion.

15th-century songs
English folk songs
English patriotic songs
Hundred Years' War
Songwriter unknown
Year of song unknown
British folk songs
British patriotic songs